Port Talbot Power Station was a proposed 1,100–1,300 MW natural gas-fired power station in Port Talbot, situated in Neath Port Talbot county borough, Wales. A proposed 350 MW biomass power station would have been sited next door to it.

Gas-fired power station
The power station was projected to cost £500 million, and be completed around 2012. It would have been built by ESB International. It would have been sited near the docks and steel works. It would have been a CCGT-type power station that runs on natural gas. In 2007 it was being reported that the "proposals are currently with the Department of Trade and Industry".

Proposed wood-fired station
The £400 million biomass plant was granted planning permission in 2007, despite fierce opposition in the town. The plant would have been a wood-fired station. The plant was being developed by Prenergy Power. However by 2013 there appeared to be no prospect of construction starting.

References

Buildings and structures in Port Talbot
Natural gas-fired power stations in Wales
Proposed natural gas-fired power stations
Proposed power stations in Wales